Hol Church may refer to:

Places
Hol Church (Buskerud), a church in Hol Municipality in Buskkerud county, Norway
Old Hol Church, a church in Hol Municipality in Buskkerud county, Norway
Hol Church (Nordland), a church in Vestvågøy Municipality in Nordland county, Norway